Jutiapa is a municipality in the Cabañas department of El Salvador. Its population was of 3,166 for the year 2013.

History 
Jutiapa is a pre-Columbian settlement, and its original name was Tepeahua. According to tradition, a group of Dominicans found the image of Saint Christopher in the area of the actual settlement, so they decided to move the inhabitants of the neighboring Azacualpa. In 1740 there lived about 25 people, and in 1770, as part of the parish of Suchitoto and in accordance with Pedro Cortés y Larraz, had a total of 189 inhabitants. In 1786, it joined the Cojutepeque Party.

Between 1824 and 1835, it was part of the department of San Salvador, and in the last year it became part of Cuscatlan. In 1859, Jutiapa had 1,772 inhabitants, and neighbouring with several farms indigo. Due to the decree on February 10, 1873, it became part to Cabañas. It received the title of town on January 25, 1879.

General information 
The municipality covers an area of 67.12 km² and has an altitude of 380 m. The festivities are celebrated in the month of November in honor to San Cristobal. The name Tepeahua means "Hill of Oaks" or "Place of oaks"; and Jutiapa, "River of the Jutes". Over the years, the town has been known as Tepeagua (1548), San Cristóbal Jutiapa (1740), and Jutiapa (1770–1807).

References

Municipalities of the Cabañas Department